The 2005 IRL IndyCar Series began on Sunday, March 6 and ended on Sunday, October 16.  The season, which consisted of 17 races, was the 10th season of the IRL IndyCar Series since it split from CART in 1995.

Dan Wheldon was the dominant driver in the series in 2005, winning six races, including the 89th running of the Indianapolis 500, setting the record for most victories in an IRL season.  However, the big story of the season was that of Rahal Letterman Racing's Danica Patrick, the fourth woman to compete in the Indy 500 and the first to lead a lap.  She would eventually wind up in fourth.  Danica's presence was a boost to the IRL's television ratings.  The Indy 500's ratings were up 40% from the year before and subsequent races also saw a boost in ratings.

The season was the first ever to introduce road courses and street circuits when the series held races at the Streets of St. Petersburg, Infineon Raceway and Watkins Glen International, where the series was previously known to have held events exclusively on oval tracks. Wheldon also became the series' first road/street course winner when he won in St. Petersburg.

The season was also the last for Chevrolet in the series, who confirmed in August that they would not return to the IRL (Chevrolet returned in 2012).  At the start of the season, only Panther Racing's Tomas Scheckter and Tomáš Enge raced Chevrolet powered cars (although A. J. Foyt IV also started racing for Chevy beginning with the AMBER Alert Portal Indy 300 at Kentucky).  The manufacturer situation within the IRL was the hot issue during the second half of the season and continued into the off-season.  Toyota announced that they would leave the series shortly after the 2005 season ended, leaving Honda as the only remaining manufacturer in the IRL. Honda extended their engine supply contract through 2009 despite expressly saying that they did not wish to be the IRL's only supplier. The IRL announced that they extended their chassis supply contract with Panoz and Dallara through 2006.

As of 2022, it was the last IndyCar Series season that the driver won the driver's championship earlier before the season finale.

Rule changes for 2005
A mandated switch to the single-point re-fueling systems used by some teams in 2004. The IRL only approved one type of fueling probe and buckeye, and these only work as a single-point system. In the approved system, two hoses coming from the storage tank combined at the fueling mechanism handled by the fueler. The crew member previously responsible for the operation of the vent and jack was now free to operate only the jack.
Cars raced on all ovals in the same configuration introduced at the 88th Indianapolis 500 in May 2004 with minimal aerodynamic changes. The changes were limited to specified areas of the underwing and sidepods. The IRL required teams to use the same engine cover as last year without modification.
Teams were allowed to change engines prior to qualifying without penalty at the following events, which were scheduled to be three-day events: Homestead, St. Petersburg, Motegi, Texas, Milwaukee, Infineon, Watkins Glen and California.
The amount of methanol teams may have in their trackside tanks was changed. Teams were allowed to carry 85 gallons for 187.5-mile races, 90 gallons for 200-mile events, 100 gallons for 225-mile events, 125 gallons for 260-mile races, 135 gallons for 300-mile events, 175 gallons for 400-mile events and 225 gallons for 500-mile events.
The mandatory minimum weight of cars was 1,600 pounds, 75 pounds heavier than the oval minimum weight. The additional weight was attributed to the brake system, which consisted of an aluminum brake caliper, steel rotor and pad as specified by the IRL, as well as the limited slip differential in the gearbox.

Confirmed entries

Race summaries

Toyota Indy 300
On March 6, at Homestead-Miami Speedway, Dan Wheldon led 158 of 200 laps to get the victory. Tomas Scheckter sat on the pole.

Top Ten Results
26- Dan Wheldon
6- Sam Hornish Jr.
11- Tony Kanaan
17- Vítor Meira
3- Hélio Castroneves
10- Darren Manning
83- Patrick Carpentier
51- Alex Barron
14- A. J. Foyt IV
91- Paul Dana

XM Satellite Radio Indy 200
On March 19, at Phoenix International Raceway, Sam Hornish Jr. won his first race of the season. Bryan Herta sat on the pole. This would be the last time IndyCar would compete at Phoenix until the race was revived in 2016.

Top Ten Results
6- Sam Hornish Jr.
3- Hélio Castroneves
11- Tony Kanaan
27- Dario Franchitti
8- Scott Sharp
26- Dan Wheldon
7- Bryan Herta
10- Darren Manning
83- Patrick Carpentier
55- Kosuke Matsuura

Honda Grand Prix of St. Petersburg
On April 3, the Honda Grand Prix on the Streets of St. Petersburg (Florida) marked the first non-oval event for the IndyCar Series. Dan Wheldon won his second race of the year.  Bryan Herta sat on the pole. Andretti Green Racing drivers swept the top 4 finishing positions.

Top Ten Results
26- Dan Wheldon
11- Tony Kanaan
27- Dario Franchitti
7- Bryan Herta
17- Vítor Meira
9- Scott Dixon
15- Buddy Rice
83- Patrick Carpentier
10- Darren Manning
51- Alex Barron

Indy Japan 300
On April 30, at Twin Ring Motegi in Motegi, Tochigi, Japan, Dan Wheldon won his third race of the season.  Sam Hornish Jr. sat on the pole.

Top Ten Results
26- Dan Wheldon
8- Scott Sharp
15- Buddy Rice
16- Danica Patrick
7- Bryan Herta
11- Tony Kanaan
6- Sam Hornish Jr.
10- Darren Manning
55- Kosuke Matsuura
4- Tomas Scheckter

89th Indianapolis 500
On May 29, at the Indianapolis Motor Speedway, Dan Wheldon won his first Indy 500 and his fourth race of the season.  However, the focus of the race was on Danica Patrick who led 19 laps, the first time a woman has ever led a lap at Indy.  Tony Kanaan sat on the pole.

Top Ten Results
26- Dan Wheldon
17- Vítor Meira
7- Bryan Herta
16- Danica Patrick
95- Buddy Lazier
27- Dario Franchitti
8- Scott Sharp
11- Tony Kanaan
3- Hélio Castroneves
33- Ryan Briscoe

Bombardier Learjet 500
On June 11, at Texas Motor Speedway, Tomas Scheckter won his first race of the season, sitting on the pole and leading for 119 of 200 laps.

Top Ten Results
4- Tomas Scheckter
6- Sam Hornish Jr.
11- Tony Kanaan
8- Scott Sharp
3- Hélio Castroneves
26- Dan Wheldon
55- Kosuke Matsuura
27- Dario Franchitti
17- Vítor Meira
7- Bryan Herta

SunTrust Indy Challenge
On June 25, at Richmond International Raceway, Hélio Castroneves won his first race of the season. Sam Hornish Jr. sat on the pole.

Top Ten Results
3- Hélio Castroneves
27- Dario Franchitti
83- Patrick Carpentier
4- Tomas Scheckter
26- Dan Wheldon
51- Alex Barron
2- Tomáš Enge
7- Bryan Herta
55- Kosuke Matsuura
16- Danica Patrick

Argent Mortgage Indy 300
On July 3, at Kansas Speedway, Tony Kanaan won by a fraction of a second over Dan Wheldon and Vítor Meira.  Danica Patrick won her first career IndyCar Series pole.

Top Ten Results
11- Tony Kanaan
26- Dan Wheldon
17- Vítor Meira
27- Dario Franchitti
4- Tomas Scheckter
8- Scott Sharp
10- Darren Manning
3- Hélio Castroneves
16- Danica Patrick
15- Buddy Rice

Firestone Indy 200
On July 16 at Nashville Superspeedway, Dario Franchitti won, leading 74 of 200 laps.  Tomas Scheckter sat on the pole. Tomas Enge fractured his back in a lap 27 crash in turn 1 and would miss the next 2 races.

Top Ten Results
27- Dario Franchitti
6- Sam Hornish Jr.
83- Patrick Carpentier
8- Scott Sharp
3- Hélio Castroneves
9- Scott Dixon
16- Danica Patrick
33- Ryan Briscoe
95- Buddy Lazier
20- Ed Carpenter

ABC Supply Company A. J. Foyt 225
On July 24 at The Milwaukee Mile, Sam Hornish Jr. won from the pole, leading 123 of 225 laps.

Top Ten Results
6- Sam Hornish Jr.
27- Dario Franchitti
4- Tomas Scheckter
11- Tony Kanaan
26- Dan Wheldon
7- Bryan Herta
83- Patrick Carpentier
51- Alex Barron
17- Vítor Meira
8- Scott Sharp

Firestone Indy 400
On July 31 at Michigan International Speedway, Bryan Herta won from the pole, leading 159 of 200 laps.

Top Ten Results
7- Bryan Herta
26- Dan Wheldon
4- Tomas Scheckter
11- Tony Kanaan
6- Sam Hornish Jr.
15- Buddy Lazier
8- Scott Sharp
27- Dario Franchitti
83- Patrick Carpentier
33- Ryan Briscoe

AMBER Alert Portal Indy 300
On August 14 at Kentucky Speedway, Scott Sharp won for the first time since 2003 at Twin Ring Motegi, holding off Vítor Meira for the last laps to win. Danica Patrick sat on the pole for the second time in the season after rain washed out qualifying and the starting grid was determined by the fastest times in practice. Tomas Enge returned from injury to finish 11th.

Top Ten Results
8- Scott Sharp
17- Vítor Meira
26- Dan Wheldon
51- Alex Barron
3- Hélio Castroneves
95- Buddy Lazier
6- Sam Hornish Jr.
55- Kosuke Matsuura
14- A. J. Foyt IV
91- Jimmy Kite

Honda Indy 225
On August 21 at Pikes Peak International Raceway, Penske Racing teammates Hélio Castroneves and Sam Hornish Jr. started 1–2.  Dan Wheldon won his fifth race of the season, tying Sam Hornish Jr.'s record for most victories in a season. This was the final IRL race at PPIR as the track was sold to International Speedway Corporation for intent to be shut down as ISC looked for a new Denver-area circuit, but plans failed and the track was sold for testing but cannot be used for competition per ISC regulation.

Top Ten Results
26- Dan Wheldon
6- Sam Hornish Jr.
11- Tony Kanaan
3- Hélio Castroneves
17- Vítor Meira
2- Tomáš Enge
27- Dario Franchitti
16- Danica Patrick
8- Scott Sharp
83- Patrick Carpentier

Argent Mortgage Indy Grand Prix
On August 28 at the circuit's inaugural race at Infineon Raceway, Tony Kanaan won the race, taking the lead on lap 52 from points leader Dan Wheldon, who was hampered by fuel problems all day and finished out of the race in 18th. Ryan Briscoe sat on the pole, but caused a three-car accident on lap 20 that also eliminated Hélio Castroneves and Danica Patrick from the race.

Top Ten Results
11- Tony Kanaan
15- Buddy Rice
51- Alex Barron
83- Patrick Carpentier
2- Tomáš Enge
55- Kosuke Matsuura
9- Scott Dixon
27- Dario Franchitti
17- Vítor Meira
14- Jeff Bucknum

Peak Antifreeze Indy 300
On September 11 at Chicagoland Speedway, Dan Wheldon won his sixth race, breaking the all-time record for most wins in an IRL season. Ryan Briscoe originally won the pole but was disqualified for a technical infraction and sent to the back of the grid. The pole winner after this became Danica Patrick for her third (and final) IndyCar pole. Briscoe's weekend got significantly worse as he was involved in a fiery crash with Alex Barron on lap 20.  Briscoe was taken by helicopter to a Chicago-area hospital with head and back pain, but was alert.  He suffered a concussion, two broken collarbones, a bruised lung and contusions to his arms and legs.  The accident resulted in a 16-minute red flag.

Top Ten Results
26- Dan Wheldon
3- Hélio Castroneves
6- Sam Hornish Jr.
4- Tomas Scheckter
11- Tony Kanaan
16- Danica Patrick
17- Vítor Meira
8- Scott Sharp
83- Patrick Carpentier
95- Buddy Lazier

Watkins Glen Indy Grand Prix
On September 25 at Watkins Glen International, Scott Dixon won his first race since his 2003 IndyCar Series Championship season. Hélio Castroneves sat on the pole. This was the first major open-wheel race at Watkins Glen since 1981 and Dixon's first road course victory. As of 2022, this was the final IndyCar Series victory for the Toyota engine to date.

Top Ten Results
9- Scott Dixon
11- Tony Kanaan
27- Dario Franchitti
10- Giorgio Pantano
26- Dan Wheldon
55- Kosuke Matsuura
6- Sam Hornish Jr.
7- Bryan Herta
8- Scott Sharp
83- Patrick Carpentier

Toyota Indy 400
On October 16 at California Speedway, Dario Franchitti won his second race of the year over Tony Kanaan by 0.111 s. Chevrolet powered cars finished 7th and 8th in their final IRL race while Toyota powered cars had a best finish of 5th in theirs. IndyCar would not return to this track until 2012.

Top Ten Results
27- Dario Franchitti
11- Tony Kanaan
17- Vítor Meira
8- Scott Sharp
6- Sam Hornish Jr.
26- Dan Wheldon
4- Tomas Scheckter
2- Tomáš Enge
3- Hélio Castroneves
9- Scott Dixon

Season summary

Schedule

 Oval/Speedway
 Road course
 Temporary street circuit
BOLD indicates Superspeedways.

Race results

Final driver standings

 Ties in points broken by number of wins, followed by number of 2nds, 3rds, etc., and then by number of pole positions, followed by number of times qualified 2nd, etc.

Engine manufacturers

Chassis manufacturers

See also
 2005 Indianapolis 500
 2005 Infiniti Pro Series season
 2005 Champ Car season
 2005 Toyota Atlantic Championship season

Footnotes

External links
IndyCar.com – official site
Indianapolis 500 – official site

Indy Racing League
IndyCar Series seasons
 
IndyCar Series